Rolf Decker is a retired German-American soccer player who played professionally with the New York Hakoah of the American Soccer League and earned four caps with the U.S. national team in between 1953 and 1956. He was a member of the U.S. Olympic soccer team at the 1956 Summer Olympics.

Club career
Decker and his brother Otto were born in Germany, but grew up in England.  In March 1939, the Decker's parents, Ilse and Hans, sent the two boys to England as part of the kindertransport, an organised rescue effort of Jewish children that took place during the nine months prior to the outbreak of the Second World War.  Rolf went on to play twice for Aylesbury United F.C.  The first time during the 1946–1947 season and again during the 1949–1950 season.

In 1950, Rolf and Otto moved to the United States to rejoin their mother who lived in New York City.  When Rolf arrived in the U.S., he signed with Brooklyn Hakoah and played from at least 1951 through 1963 with the team which was by then known as New York Hakoah.  In 1955, both Rolf and Otto played for the Hokoah squad which lost in the semifinals the National Challenge Cup.  In 1957, Hakoah lost to St. Louis Kutis SC in the final of the National Cup.  Between 1957 and 1959, Decker and his team mates won three consecutive league titles.

National team
Decker earned four caps with the U.S. national team in between 1953 and 1956.  His first game with the national team came on June 8, 1953 in a 6-3 loss to England.  He played two games in 1954, both 1954 FIFA World Cup qualification victories over Haiti.  Despite these two wins, the U.S. had already failed to qualify for the finals after losing twice to Mexico earlier in the year.  Decker’s last cap came in the only U.S. game of 1955, a 3-2 loss to Iceland on August 25, 1955.

Decker was selected for the U.S. soccer team at the 1956 Summer Olympics.  The U.S. lost its first match in this single elimination tournament and did not make the second round.

See also
List of select Jewish football (association; soccer) players

References

External links
 
 Rolf Decker at Aylesbury United F.C.
 Reunion of Holocaust survivors stirs emotions, memories
 

Year of birth missing (living people)
Living people
American people of German-Jewish descent
American soccer players
American Soccer League (1933–1983) players
Aylesbury United F.C. players
Brooklyn Hakoah players
German footballers
Kindertransport refugees
German emigrants to the United States
Jewish American sportspeople
New York Hakoah players
Olympic soccer players of the United States
Footballers at the 1956 Summer Olympics
United States men's international soccer players
Association football midfielders
21st-century American Jews